UFC Fight Night: Dillashaw vs. Cruz (also known as UFC Fight Night 81) was a mixed martial arts event held on January 17, 2016, at the TD Garden in Boston, Massachusetts.

Background
A UFC Bantamweight Championship bout between defending champion T.J. Dillashaw and former WEC and UFC Bantamweight champion Dominick Cruz headlined this event.

Beneil Dariush was expected to face Mairbek Taisumov at this event. However, on December 3, Dariush was forced to pull out of the bout due to injury. He was replaced by Chris Wade. In turn, Taisumov was pulled from the fight during the week leading to the event due to alleged visa issues and was replaced by promotional newcomer Mehdi Baghdad.

Dennis Bermudez was expected to face Maximo Blanco at this event. However, on December 5, Bermudez pulled out of the bout due to a staph infection in his shin. On January 4, it was announced that he was replaced by promotional newcomer Luke Sanders.

Patrick Williams was expected to face Rob Font at this event. However, Williams was forced to pull out due to injury in late December and was replaced by promotional newcomer Joey Gomez.

Jimy Hettes was expected to face Charles Rosa. However, on January 10, only 8 days before the event, Hettes pulled out due to injury. He was very briefly replaced by promotional newcomer Augusto Mendes. Just two days later, Mendes was removed from the fight and was replaced by fellow newcomer Kyle Bochniak.

Promotional newcomer Abdul-Kerim Edilov was expected to face Francimar Barroso at the event. However, Edilov pulled out of the fight in the days leading up to the event citing a knee injury and was replaced by fellow newcomer Elvis Mutapčić.

Results

Bonus awards
The following fighters were awarded $50,000 bonuses:
Fight of the Night: Dominick Cruz vs. T.J. Dillashaw
Performance of the Night: Ed Herman and Luke Sanders

Reported payouts
The following is the reported payout to the fighters as reported to the Massachusetts State Athletic Commission. It does not include sponsor money or "locker room" bonuses often given by the UFC and also do not include the UFC's traditional "fight night" bonuses.

Dominick Cruz: $110,000 (includes $55,000 win bonus) def. T.J. Dillashaw: $70,000
Eddie Alvarez: $100,000 (no win bonus) def. Anthony Pettis: $80,000
Travis Browne: $120,000 (includes $60,000 win bonus) def. Matt Mitrione: $36,000
Francisco Trinaldo: $54,000 (includes $27,000 win bonus) def. Ross Pearson: $48,000
Patrick Côté: $86,000 (includes $43,000 win bonus) def. Ben Saunders: $18,000 
Ed Herman: $94,000 (includes $47,000 win bonus) def. Tim Boetsch: $52,000
Chris Wade: $34,000 (includes $17,000 win bonus) def. Mehdi Baghdad: $12,000
Luke Sanders: $20,000 (includes $10,000 win bonus) def. Maximo Blanco: $25,000
Paul Felder: $36,000 (includes $18,000 win bonus) def. Daron Cruickshank: $20,000
Ilir Latifi: $44,000 (includes $22,000 win bonus) def. Sean O'Connell: $18,000
Charles Rosa: $24,000 (includes $12,000 win bonus) def. Kyle Bochniak $10,000
Rob Font: $20,000 (includes $10,000 win bonus) def. Joey Gomez: $10,000
Francimar Barroso: $30,000 (includes $15,000 win bonus) def. Elvis Mutapcic: $18,000

See also

List of UFC events
2016 in UFC

References

UFC Fight Night
2016 in Boston
2016 in mixed martial arts
2016 in sports in Massachusetts
Events in Boston
January 2016 sports events in the United States
Mixed martial arts in Massachusetts
Sports competitions in Boston